The General Assembly  is the supreme decision-making body of the Organization of American States (OAS).

The General Assembly came into being as a part of the restructuring of the OAS that took place following adoption of the Protocol of Buenos Aires (signed 27 February 1967; in force as of 12 March 1970), which contained extensive amendments to the Organization's Charter. Prior to these changes, the OAS's top body was the Inter-American Conference, which in turn was the successor to the International Conference of American States.

The Charter requires that the General Assembly convene once every year in a regular session. 
In special circumstances, and with the approval of two-thirds of the member states, the Permanent Council can convene special sessions.

The Organization's member states take turns hosting the General Assembly on a rotating basis. 
The states are represented at its sessions by their chosen delegates: generally, their ministers of foreign affairs, or their appointed deputies. Each state has one vote, and most matters – except for those for which the Charter or the General Assembly's own rules of procedure specifically require a two-thirds majority – are settled by a simple majority vote.

The General Assembly's powers include setting the OAS's general course and policies by means of resolutions and declarations; approving its budget and determining the contributions payable by the member states; approving the reports and previous year's actions of the OAS's specialized agencies; and electing members to serve on those agencies.

Regular sessions

See also
Summit of the Americas

References

External links
Regular Meetings of the General Assembly

Organization of American States